Huerniopsis is a genus of plants in the Apocynaceae family, first described in 1878. It is native to southern Africa.

Species
 Huerniopsis atrosanguinea (N.E. Br.) A.C. White & B. Sloane - N Botswana
 Huerniopsis decipiens N.E.Br. - Western Cape Province
 Huerniopsis gibbosa Nel - Lobatsi in Botswana
 Huerniopsis papillata Nel - Debeeti in Botswana

References

Asclepiadoideae
Apocynaceae genera